Chester Creek Trail may refer to: 

Chester Creek Trail (Alaska)
Chester Creek Trail (Pennsylvania)